Ezekiel Kemboi Cheboi (born 25 May 1982) is a Kenyan professional athlete, winner of the 3000 metres steeplechase at the 2004 Summer Olympics, the 2009 World Championships, the 2011 World Championships, the 2012 Summer Olympics, the 2013 World Championships and the 2015 World Championships. His 3000 m steeplechase best of 7:55.76 set at Monaco in 2011 places him as the sixth fastest of all time. This time is also the fastest non-winning time in history. He is one of only four men to have won both Olympic and World golds in the event, along with Reuben Kosgei, Brimin Kipruto and Conseslus Kipruto.  He is the only multiple gold medalist in both. He is the only athlete to have won four world championships in the steeplechase (which he won consecutively), and only the second athlete to win two Olympic titles in the event (after Volmari Iso-Hollo).

Biography
Born in Matira, which is near Kapsowar, Marakwet District, Kemboi graduated from Kapsowar Boys Secondary School in 1999. He did not take up athletics until after he left school, but was spotted by Paul Ereng and won the African Junior Championships in 2001 despite falling.

Kemboi became African Junior Champion in 2001 and then in 2002, he finished second at the Commonwealth Games behind compatriot Stephen Cherono. The same year Kemboi was originally fourth at the African Championships in Athletics, but was later awarded bronze after the winner Moroccan Brahim Boulami received a doping suspension.

At the 2003 World Championships, Kemboi had a gruelling battle with former teammate Saif Saeed Shaheen (formerly Stephen Cherono) who represented his new country Qatar, before Shaheen pulled away from the exhausted Kemboi to win by less than a second. Kemboi won the gold medal at the 2003 All-Africa Games.

In the absence of Shaheen – the Kenyan Olympic Committee refused to waive the three-year eligibility delay for established athletes who switch nationalities – Kemboi rose to a main favourite status at the Athens Olympics. The race went very much according to form, with the three Kenyans Kemboi, Brimin Kipruto and Paul Kipsiele Koech pushing the pace from the second lap and soon leaving the rest of the field behind and Kemboi winning a gold medal 0.3 seconds ahead of Kipruto in a Kenyan sweep.

In August 2005 he won a silver medal at the 2005 World Championships in Athletics again behind Shaheen, and in March 2006 he won the 2006 Commonwealth Games. He finished second at the 2006 African Championships in Athletics, but was disqualified for improper hurdling. At the 2007 World Championships in Athletics he won his third successive silver medal, this time losing to Kipruto.

Kemboi represented Kenya at the 2008 Beijing Olympics but managed only seventh – his worst performance on the global stage. He rebounded with a win at the 2009 World Championships (his first world championship gold medal) after three successive silvers and took silver at the 2010 African Championships the following year behind 2008 bronze medalist Richard Mateelong.

He took to the road races of Italy in August 2010, beating Peter Kimeli to the tape to win the Corribianco race in Bianco, then taking the honours at the 8.5-kilometre Amatrice-Configno.

He won the gold medal at the 2011 World Championships in Athletics in Daegu, South Korea.

Kemboi won the gold medal for Kenya in the 3000m Steeplechase in London 2012. Kemboi won in a time of eight minutes 18.56 seconds.

In 2013 he added his third straight gold medal at the World Championships. In 2015, he took his fourth successive title at the 2015 World Championships in Athletics.
On August 17, 2016, he won a bronze medal for Kenya in the 3000m Steeplechase in Rio Olympics 2016. He then announced his retirement after the win. Kemboi was later that day disqualified for stepping outside of the track. An investigation into the incident was instigated when the French Olympic team complained that the runner had stepped out of the track after his final water jump during the race. The bronze medal was subsequently awarded to French runner Mahiedine Mekhissi-Benabbad.  He announced his retirement immediately following the Olympic race, but rescinded that decision after learning of his disqualification.  He made one final attempt, making the finals at the 2017 World Championships, where he finished a disappointing 11th place.

Personal life
Kemboi is managed by Enrico Dionisi. Since 2002 he has owned a  farm near Moi's Bridge, Trans-Nzoia District. He is married to Jane Kemboi with two sons. Since 2009 he has been coached by Moses Kiptanui, who is also his neighbour.

His participation in the 2012 Olympics was initially put in doubt when he was charged with assault in June 2012, after a woman claimed he stabbed her after she refused his sexual advances.

Achievements

References

External links
 
 

1982 births
Living people
People from Elgeyo-Marakwet County
Kalenjin people
Kenyan male middle-distance runners
Kenyan male steeplechase runners
Athletes (track and field) at the 2004 Summer Olympics
Athletes (track and field) at the 2008 Summer Olympics
Athletes (track and field) at the 2012 Summer Olympics
Athletes (track and field) at the 2016 Summer Olympics
Olympic athletes of Kenya
Athletes (track and field) at the 2006 Commonwealth Games
Athletes (track and field) at the 2010 Commonwealth Games
Athletes (track and field) at the 2014 Commonwealth Games
Commonwealth Games gold medallists for Kenya
Commonwealth Games silver medallists for Kenya
Olympic gold medalists for Kenya
World Athletics Championships medalists
Medalists at the 2012 Summer Olympics
Medalists at the 2004 Summer Olympics
World Athletics Championships athletes for Kenya
Commonwealth Games bronze medallists for Kenya
Olympic gold medalists in athletics (track and field)
Athletes (track and field) at the 2002 Commonwealth Games
Commonwealth Games medallists in athletics
African Games gold medalists for Kenya
African Games medalists in athletics (track and field)
Athletes (track and field) at the 2003 All-Africa Games
Athletes (track and field) at the 2007 All-Africa Games
World Athletics Championships winners
IAAF World Athletics Final winners
Medallists at the 2002 Commonwealth Games
Medallists at the 2006 Commonwealth Games
Medallists at the 2010 Commonwealth Games